Ruine Pflindsberg is a castle in Styria, Austria.

Around 1250 Philipp of Spanheim, the Archbishop-elect of Salzburg, occupied the Ausseerland and the Ennstal in Styria. For the coverage of his claim to power he built the small Pflindsberg castle on a hill west of the village Altaussee. In 1254 he had to withdraw, and the region returned to Styria. In the following centuries the Pflindsberg castle developed into a regional seignory with the right to hold high justice. It was administered by an official of the styrian Landesfürst. The castle was abandoned in 1755 and already a ruin in 1780.

See also
List of castles in Austria

References

Castles in Styria